The Chicago and Northwestern Depot is a historic railway station located at the northeast corner of Sacramento and DeKalb Streets in Sycamore, Illinois. The station was built in 1865 to serve as Sycamore's main railway station. While Sycamore was bypassed by the Chicago and Northwestern Railway (C&NW) in the early 1850s, several community leaders developed and built the Sycamore, Cortland, and Chicago Railway to link Sycamore to the C&NW at Cortland. The original line, which opened in 1855, lacked an engine and pulled railcars by mule; as the railway became more successful, it was able to purchase an engine and build the station in Sycamore. The station has an Italianate design which resembles contemporary DeKalb architecture but is noticeably different from the standardized depots built elsewhere in the C&NW system. The branch and station were acquired by the C&NW in 1883.

The station was added to the National Register on December 8, 1978. At the time of its listing, it was being used as a warehouse by ITT-Holub Industries.

References

Railway stations on the National Register of Historic Places in Illinois
National Register of Historic Places in DeKalb County, Illinois
Sycamore, Illinois
Sycamore
Sycamore
Transportation buildings and structures in DeKalb County, Illinois
Railway stations in the United States opened in 1865